Svein Rosseland (March 31, 1894, in Kvam, Hardanger – January 19, 1985, in Bærum) was a Norwegian astrophysicist and a pioneer in the field of theoretical astrophysics.

Biography
Svein Rosseland was born in Kvam, in Hardanger, Norway. Rosseland grew up the youngest of nine siblings. He went to his final exams in Haugesund in 1917 and then went to the University of Oslo. After only three semesters at the University he left in 1919 to work as an assistant professor with the meteorologist Vilhelm Bjerknes at the Bergen School of Meteorology. In 1920 he went to the Institute of Physics (now the Niels Bohr Institute) in Copenhagen, where he met Niels Bohr and other prominent physicists, and where he wrote two seminal papers. He spent 1924–1926 as a Rockefeller Fellow at the Mount Wilson Observatory in Pasadena, California.

In 1927, Rosseland earned a PhD. from the University of Oslo. As a professor at the University of Oslo from 1928 to 1964, he built up and headed academics at the Institute of Theoretical Astrophysics (Institutt for Teoretisk Astrofysikk). Rosseland was a key participant when the University of Oslo built the Institute of Theoretical Astrophysics in 1934, using funding from the Rockefeller Foundation.  Between 1929-30 he was a guest professor at the Harvard College Observatory. In 1934 he founded the journal Astrophysics Norvegica, published by the Norwegian Academy of Science and Letters. In 1936 he published his textbook Theoretical Astrophysics, which contained numerous original contributions. Rosseland was instrumental in the effort behind the building of the Oslo Analyzer, finished in 1938 and for four years the world's most powerful differential analyzer.

With the German occupation of Norway in World War II, he fled the country and went to the United States where he was appointed professor at Princeton University. In 1943 he went to London to work with the development of radar by the British Air Defense Ministry and later at the Admiralty, where he worked on underwater explosions. He was also a consultant for the U.S. Time Corporation, a company that later evolved into the Norwegian-owned company Timex Group USA.  In the war's final years, he worked on military research at Columbia University.

Rosseland returned to Norway in 1946. In the postwar period he was involved in the development of the Norwegian research policy and was among those involved in the creation of the Institute for Energy Technology which was established in 1948 and Norwegian Academy of Technological Sciences which was founded during 1955.  He was also the driving force behind the creation of Harestua Solar Observatory located at Gunnarshaugen in Oppland,  which was inaugurated in 1954.

Rosseland was Norwegian delegate to the CERN Council in the early days of the organization.

Legacy 

In 1957 he was decorated Commander of the Royal Norwegian Order of St. Olav. The minor planet 1646 Rosseland and the lunar crater Rosseland are named after him, as is the Rosseland mean opacity. The Institute of Theoretical Astrophysics at the University of Oslo is housed in "Svein Rosseland's House". In honor of the 100th anniversary of his birth, the Svein Rosseland Centenary Symposium was held at the Norwegian Academy of Science and Letters in Oslo during June 1994. A bust of him was also erected at Steinsdalsfossen near his home in Norheimsund.

Selected works
On the Internal Constitution of the Stars, 1925
The Principle of Quantum Theory, 1930
On the Stability of Gaseous Stars, 1931
 Astrophysik auf atomtheoretischer Grundlage, 1931
 Theoretical Astrophysics, 1936
 Jorda og universet. Matematisk geografi, 1940
 The Pulsation Theory of Variable Stars, 1949

Notes

References
Randers, G. Svein Rosseland 50 År ( Norsk Populær-Astronomisk Tidsskrift,  vol. 3, pp. 33–35, 1945)
Randers, G. Rosseland, Svein (Norwegian Biographical Lexicon, vol. 12, pp. 1–2, 1946)
Randers, G. and M. Schwarzschild Professor Svein Rosseland (Astrophysics Norvegica, vol. 9, pp. 7–9, 1964)
 Elgarøy, Ø. and Ø. Hauge, Svein Rosseland. Fra hans liv og virke (Institute of Theoretical Astrophysics, Univ. of Oslo, 1994)
 Holst, Per A. Svein Rosseland and the Oslo Analyzer (IEEE Annals of the History of Computing 18(4):16-26, 1996)

External links
Institutt for Teoretisk Astrofysikk
Solobservatoriet på Harestua
Image of Svein Rosseland
Svein Rosselands hus

1894 births
1985 deaths
People from Kvam
People associated with CERN
Norwegian astronomers
20th-century astronomers
Rockefeller Fellows
Members of the Norwegian Academy of Science and Letters
Members of the Norwegian Academy of Technological Sciences
Members of the Royal Swedish Academy of Sciences